Shelly Anne Short (née Hager; born April 3, 1962) is an American politician from Washington. Short is a Republican member of the Washington Senate, representing the 7th Legislative District. Short replaced Brian Dansel, who resigned to accept a position in the Trump Administration.

Awards 
 2014 Guardians of Small Business award. Presented by NFIB.
 2021 City Champion Awards. Presented by Association of Washington Cities (AWC).

Personal life 
Short's husband is Mitch Short. Short has two children. Short and her family live in Addy, Washington.

References

External links 
 Shelly Short at ballotpedia.org
 Biography on Washington State Legislature website

1962 births
Living people
21st-century American politicians
21st-century American women politicians
Republican Party members of the Washington House of Representatives
People from Stevens County, Washington
Women state legislators in Washington (state)
Republican Party Washington (state) state senators